Grimae Awards is an awards ceremony held annually by the Korean Television Producers Association since 1993. The award aims to promote the development of innovative visuals due to the phenomenon of media convergence both inside and outside the world at the present time, where the role of the cinematographer in the Korean broadcasting company is increasing, and to improve the qualities and competence of each individual filmmaker. The actors and actress categories are selected by the filmmakers' directors voting for performers who have the most outstanding performances and good images during the last year.

Grand Prize

Best Picture (Drama)

Best Picture (Documentary)

Best Picture (TV Commercial)

Best Picture (Variety Show)

Best Actor

Best Actress

Best New Actor/Actress

Best Entertainer Award

See also

 List of Asian television awards

References

External links
Korean Directors of Photography Society
 
Annual events in South Korea
South Korean television awards